Saleem is a 2009 Indian Telugu-language romantic action thriller film directed by YVS Chowdary (of Devadasu fame). The film was released on 11 December 2009. Starring Vishnu Manchu, Ileana D'Cruz and Mohan Babu in the lead roles. This was an utter flop film at box office.

Plot
The story begins with Saleem (Vishnu Manchu) beating up baddies in a village to save his love interest Satya (Ileana).
In a flashback he is shown to be the world's most wanted gangster. He is wanted in Mexico, Switzerland and Miami. In all these places he is big gangster.  Why he went after Ileana makes up the rest of the story.

Cast

 Manchu Vishnu as Saleem / Munna
 Ileana D'Cruz as Satyavati "Satya"
 Mohan Babu as Ogirala Jogaiah "Ozo"
 Venkat as Krish
 Mukesh Rishi as Appala Naidu
 Ali as Gafar Khan
 Jeeva as Appala Naidu's henchman
 Raghu Babu as Janaki, Ojo's henchman
 Napoleon as Singamanaidu, Satyavati's father
 Kaveri Jha as English teacher
 Banerjee as Appala Naidu's henchman
 Brahmanandam
 Tanikella Bharani as Satyavati's relative
 Prudhviraj as Satyavati's relative
 Jaya Prakash Reddy as Satyavati's relative
 Hema as Satyavati's relative
 Pragathi as Satyavati's mother
 Sivannarayana Naripeddi as Satyavati's relative
 Bharath Reddy as Satyavati's fake groom
 Giri Babu as Singamanaidu's friend
 Master Bharath
 M S Narayana as Satyavati's relative
 Telangana Shakuntala as Nookamma
 Ramya Sri as Appala Naidu's wife
 Giridhar as Satyavati's relative
 Amit Jha

Soundtrack

The soundtrack has music composed by Sandeep Chowtha, with lyrics by Chandrabose. The music was released on 11 November 2009.

References

External links
 

2009 films
2000s Telugu-language films
Indian romantic comedy films
Indian gangster films
2009 romantic comedy films
Reliance Entertainment films
Films scored by Sandeep Chowta
Films directed by Y. V. S. Chowdary